Dancing with the Stars SA is a South African dance competition television series that premiered on 4 February 2018 on M-Net. The show is the South African version of the BBC Worldwide format Dancing with the Stars. The show is produced by Rapid Blue and co-hosted by Tracey Lange and Chris Jaftha.

The format of the show consists of 6 male and 6 female celebrities paired with a professional dancer. Each couple performs predetermined dances and competes against the others for judges' points and audience votes. The couple receiving the lowest combined total of judges' points and audience votes is eliminated each week until only the champion dance pair remains.

Cast

Hosts 
 Chris Jaftha
 Tracey Lange

Judges 
 Jason Gilkison
 Tebogo Kgobokoe
 Debbie Turner
 Bryan Watson

Winner 
 2018: Connell Cruise

Stars

Season One

Scoring and voting 
Every dance is scored out of 40 by the four Judges (each judge contributing a score out of 10) and these Judge's scores create the official ranking of the contestants for the week. Pre-registered voters cast their vote during the live show for their favorite couple (a maximum of 100 votes on the website platform and 100 votes on the mobile platform; a total of 200 votes per registered voter). The ranking determined by the judges gives each position on the leaderboard assigned points. With 11 contestants the system works as follows; first place is awarded 11 points, second place is awarded 10 points, third place is awarded 9 points and so on until eleventh place which is awarded 1 point. The public vote is tallied at the end of the Live Show and a ranking is determined based on those votes. Once again, this ranking assigns points based on position. With 11 contestants the system works as follows; first position is awarded 11 points, second position is awarded 10 points, third position is awarded 9 points and so on until eleventh position which is awarded 1 point. For each contestant the points earned by the Judge's ranking and points earned by the public votes are added to create a final score and the couple with the lowest combined score is eliminated.

Scoring charts 

Red numbers indicate the lowest score for each week
Green numbers indicate the highest score for each week
 the couple eliminated that week
 the winning couple
 the runner-up couple

Average Score Chart

Times and reception 
The show airs on M-Net on a Sunday at 17:00 to 19:00 and the Live Results Show takes place after M-Net's flagship Investigative show Carte Blanche from 20:00 to 20:30.

References

External links

Dancing with the Stars
South African reality television series
South African music television series
2018 South African television series debuts
South African television series based on British television series